Mehdi Sheykh is an Iranian cleric and reformist politician who is currently a member of the Parliament of Iran representing Tehran, Rey, Shemiranat, Eslamshahr and Pardis.

Career 
Sheykh was an activist outside Iran.

Electoral history

References

1966 births
Living people
Members of the 10th Islamic Consultative Assembly
Volunteer Basij personnel of the Iran–Iraq War